Rafael Fernando Squirru (March 23, 1925 – March 5, 2016) was an Argentine poet, lecturer, art critic and essayist.

Biographical notes 

Born and raised in Buenos Aires, Squirru was educated at Saint Andrew's Scot School and at the Jesuit El Salvador Secondary School.  He graduated with a Law Degree at the University of Edinburgh in 1948.

After founding the Buenos Aires Museum of Modern Art in 1956, he went on to champion the cause of Argentine and Latin American art as Director of Cultural Affairs (1960) in the government of Arturo Frondizi. Among his many initiatives of that period, Alicia Penalba’s sculptures and Antonio Berni’s  etchings were sent to the São Paulo and Venice Biennales respectively, both artists obtaining First Prize.

Named Cultural Director of the Organization of American States (OAS) in 1963 with headquarters in Washington, D.C., he continued his task of  promotion of North and Latin American culture until his resignation in 1970. It was at this time that he supported the construction of the impressive memorial monument to U.S. President John F. Kennedy by Uruguayan artist Lincoln Presno in Quemú Quemú, a vast deserted plain in the Argentine province of La Pampa; his outspoken inauguration speech as official representative of the OAS, pronounced during the military government of General Juan Carlos Onganía, won public acclaim while provoking angry reactions on the part of  the authorities present, earning him the local government’s condemnation as persona non grata, revoked a few years later.

Back in Buenos Aires he has supported culture in all its forms through an incessant activity of  lectures in his own country and abroad, prologues for artists’ exhibitions and a constant output of articles on Argentine daily La Nación, with which he collaborated for over  twenty years, often sharing the Culture page with Jorge Luis Borges during the Eighties.

Several volumes of Squirru’s poetry and prose writings have been published over the years, most of which are today out of print and considerably difficult to find.
 
His friends, correspondents and acquaintances included such personalities as Henry Miller, Fernando Demaría, Thomas Merton, Edward Hopper, Ned O'Gorman, Huntington Hartford, Sir Herbert Read, Edward Albee,  Oswaldo Vigas, Julio Cortázar,  Olga Blinder, Alejandra Pizarnik, Barnaby Conrad, Paul Blackburn, Amancio Williams, Jackie Kennedy and Robert F. Kennedy, Batuz, Renata Adler, J. Carter Brown, Benjamin Bradlee, Nina Auchincloss Straight, Kay Halle, Alberto Ginastera, Elsa Wiezell, Hiram D. Williams, Leopoldo Marechal,  Arthur Schlesinger Jr., Stefan Baciu, Emilio Pettoruti, Antonio Berni, Eduardo Mac Entyre, Pérez Celis, Leopoldo Presas, Leonardo Castellani and Marco Denevi.

Books 

Art criticism

 Barragán, Buenos Aires, Galería Rubbers, 1960.
 Leopoldo Presas, Buenos Aires, El Mangrullo, 1972.
 Pérez Celis, Buenos Aires, Ediciones del Hombre Nuevo, 1973.
 Albino Fernández, Buenos Aires, La Barca Gráfica, 1975.
 Antonio Berni, Buenos Aires, Dead Weight, 1975.
 Guillermo Roux, Buenos Aires, Dead Weight, 1975.
 Pintura, pintura, siete valores argentinos en el arte actual, Buenos Aires, Ediciones Arte y Crítica, 1975.
Luis Seoane, Buenos Aires, Dead Weight, 1978.
  Liberti, Buenos Aires, Dead Weight, 1978.
 Arte de América: 25 años de crítica, Buenos Aires, Gaglianone, 1979.
 Héctor Giuffré, Buenos Aires, Gaglianone, 1980.
 Batuz (con D. Ronte, R. A. Kuchta e C. Heigl), New York, Rizzoli International Publications, 1981.
 Buenos Aires y sus esculturas, Buenos Aires, Manrique Zago, 1981.
 Eduardo Mac Entyre, Buenos Aires, Gaglianone, 1981.
 Aldo Severi, Buenos Aires, Dead Weight, 1982.
 Arte argentino hoy. Una selección de 48 artistas, Buenos Aires, Gaglianone, 1983.
 Juan Del Prete, Buenos Aires, Gaglianone, 1984.
 Mariano Pagés: 1945-1983, Buenos Aires, 1984.
 Four Contemporary Painters from Argentina: Horacio Bustos, Pérez Celis, Kenneth Kemble, Juan Carlos Liberti, University of Florida, 1986.
 Miguel Ocampo, Buenos Aires, Gaglianone, 1986.
 Kenneth Kemble, Buenos Aires, Gaglianone, 1987.
 Elena Tarasido: la opción de la libertad, Buenos Aires, Instituto Salesiano de Artes Gráficas, 1988.
 Inés Bancalari 1976-1987, Buenos Aires, Gaglianone, 1988.
 Cuarenta maestros del arte de los Argentinos (with I. Gutiérrez Zaldivar), Buenos Aires, Zurbarán, 1990.
 Gyula Kosice: obras Madi, Buenos Aires, Gaglianone, 1990.
 Quinquela: popular y clásico, Buenos Aires, 1990.
 Juan M. Sánchez, Buenos Aires, Ennio Ayosa, 1991.
 Mara Marini, Iglesias Kuppenhein, 1992.
 Carpani cabalga al tigre (con M. Vincent), Madrid, Ollero y Ramos, 1994.
 Roma Geber. Imágenes urbanas, Buenos Aires, Arte al Día, 1997.
 Leopoldo Torres Agüero, Fragments Editions, 1999.
 Perez Celis (with Frederick Ted Castle and Peter Frank),  Shapolsky, 1999

Art criticism in verse

 49 artistas de América: itinerario poético, Buenos Aires, Gaglianone, 1984.

Poetry
 La noche iluminada, Buenos Aires, Ediciones del Hombre Nuevo, 1957.
 Amor 33, Buenos Aires, Ediciones del Hombre Nuevo, 1958.
 Números, Buenos Aires, Ediciones del Hombre Nuevo, 1960.
 Awareness of Love (poetical comment on the work of Juan Downey), Washington D.C., H.K. Press, 1966.
 Poesía 1957-1966, Buenos Aires, Dead Weight, 1966.
 Poesía 1966-1970, Buenos Aires, Juárez, 1970.
 Poesía 1970-1971. La edad del cerdo y otros poemas, Buenos Aires, Dead Weight, 1971.
 Poesía 1971-1973. Quincunce americano, Buenos Aires, Dead Weight, 1973.
 Poesía 1973-1975. Cuaderno de bitácora, Buenos Aires, Dead Weight, 1975.
 Poesía 1975-1977. La Corona, Buenos Aires, Dead Weight, 1977.
 Números. Veinte años de poesía (1957-1977), Buenos Aires, La Barca Gráfica, 1977.
 Chrysopeya del buen amor, Buenos Aires, Albino y Asociados, 1986.

Essays

 Filosofía del arte abstracto, Buenos Aires, Museo de Arte Moderno, 1961.
 Leopoldo Marechal, Buenos Aires, Ediciones Culturales Argentinas, 1961.
 The Challenge of the New Man. A cultural approach to the Latin American scene, Washington D.C., Pan American Union, 1964.
 Towards a World Community, Chicago, Academy of Arts and Sciences, 1968.
 Martin Fierro  (with other authors), Buenos Aires, Instituto Salesiano de Artes Gráficas, 1972.
 Claves del arte actual, Buenos Aires, Troquel, 1976.
 Ángeles y Monstruos. Ensayos Breves, Buenos Aires, Gaglianone, 1986.
 Hacia la pintura: como apreciarla, Buenos Aires, Editorial Atlántida, 1988
 Exigencias del arte, Buenos Aires, Zurbarán, 1989.
 El artista y su tiempo, Buenos Aires, Rozenblum, 1991.
 Arte y humanismo, Buenos Aires, Fundación Praxis, 1993.
 Libros y libros, cuadros y cuadros, Morón, Universidad de Morón, 1995.

Translations

William Shakespeare, Hamlet, Buenos Aires, Dead Weight, 1976.
 William Shakespeare, La tempestad, Buenos Aires, Biblioteca Nacional, 1979.

Drama

 El Rey Salomón (drama bíblico en tres actos), Buenos Aires, Marchand Editorial, 1980.

Quotes 

Prose

On the importance of culture

 The time has come when it must be acknowledged that art and thought are more than just a luxury: they are the abstract symbol of a community’s deepest longings.
 We should be careful not to raise economic and social issues above the level where they naturally belong for when that happens, we shall have succumbed to the pathetic idolatry of the golden calf.
 We are pained not so much by the ignorance of those who cannot read, as by the ignorance of those who cannot see.
 Our enemy is not man but stupidity.
 I can see no higher privilege for a society than that of having the intellectual and the poet in its midst.
 Societies will not tolerate a state of spiritual vacuum.

On the cultural identity and importance of Latin America

 The great nations of Spain and Portugal, England and Scotland, Ireland and other European countries have given being to our communities and, happily for Latin America, in combination with the blood of the native Indian peoples which runs through our veins, sustaining and nourishing us.
 Latin America is underdeveloped economically. Latin America is not underdeveloped culturally.
 In the realm of creative achievement, many among the best artists, composers, writers and intellectuals of today are to be found in Latin America.

On the functions of art

 The purpose of art and thought is to reveal to man his true essence putting him face to face with his deeper self.
 Art is like a mirror and every man reacts to a work of art according to what he himself is.
 Very often what art reveals to man is something he would prefer not to see; that explains why art has so many detractors.

On the responsibilities of artists and intellectuals

 The poet must be a part of the world but he cannot be its creature.
 I cannot agree to reduce or limit the creative act to the needs and levels of sociological considerations.
 A poet is neither a politician nor an economist nor a sociologist. The intellectual, the artist and the creative mind does not adhere to this or that partial aspect of man but to man himself.
 The great legacies of any culture - whether their creators  be called Aeschylus, Shakespeare, Cervantes, Kafka or Picasso - move us today because they present man with his problems, his pains and his joys, which are far more lasting than his social, political or economic condition.
 Those who have pledged themselves to the major revolution of the spirit must firmly refuse the compromise of minor revolutions and the distraction of partial goals.

On Communism in Latin America

 The Marxist alternative might well carry out a revolution, as in Cuba, but it would never be our own and would thus bring all the frustration that incompatibility implies.
 Take away the images of the Saints and you will get the image of Lenin in no time.
 Communism overruns any country which does not possess its own mystique.

(The above quotes are all excerpts from Squirru’s addresses delivered at the Panamerican Union in Washington D.C. between 1963 and 1964, which can be found in their entirety in The Challenge of the New Man. A cultural approach to the Latin American scene, Washington D.C., Pan American Union, 1964.)

Books on Rafael Squirru 
 Augusto Rodríguez Larreta, El Arte y Rafael Squirru. Ediciones del Hombre Nuevo, Buenos Aires 1951
 Marta Campomar, Rafael Squirru - ojo crítico y palabra creadora. Ediciones de arte Gaglianone, Buenos Aires 1997.
 Eloisa Squirru, Tan Rafael Squirru!, Ediciones El Elefante Blanco, Buenos Aires 2008.

Distinctions 
  
 Doctor Honoris Causa in Humanities, University of Neuquén, Argentina
 Doctor Honoris Causa in Humanities, University of Morón, Argentina
 Konex Platinum Award in Visual Arts, Konex Foundation, Buenos Aires
 Gratia Artis Prize of the Academia Nacional de Bellas Artes, Argentina
 Honorary Member of The Association of The Corcoran Gallery
 Consultant Member of the CARI (Consejo Argentino Relaciones Internacionales) of Buenos Aires
 Honorary Member of the Miguel Lillo Foundation, San Miguel de Tucumán, Argentina
 Honorary Member of the Academia de Bellas Artes of Chile
 Lorenzutti Foundation Prize for Art Criticism

References

External links
 https://www.rafaelsquirru.com/
 https://web.archive.org/web/20120207100721/http://www.zurbarangaleria.com.ar/expos/squirru05/squirru05.html
 El Poeta, fiel al amor, essay.
 Newspaper La Nación's tribute for Squirru's  80th birthday.
  "Rafael Squirru" Hall at Casapueblo
 Thomas Merton's Correspondence
 "Cabalgando el Tigre" by Rafael Squirru
  Konex Prizes
 Alejandra Pizarnik letter to Rafael Squirru
 Rafael Squirru, un largo combate por el arte.
 
 
 
 
 

1925 births
2016 deaths
People from Buenos Aires
Alumni of the University of Edinburgh
20th-century Argentine poets
20th-century Argentine male writers
Argentine male poets
Argentine art critics
Argentine essayists
Male essayists
20th-century essayists